This page is the discography of the Greek artist Nino.

Discography

Studio albums

Singles

Compilations

Singles
(Not all singles were released on CD)
 2003: "Sa Navagoi"
 2003: "Olos O Kosmos"
 2003: "As Teleiosoume"
 2003: "Kalimera"
 2004: "Fovamai"
 2005: "Gia Na Eimai Eilikrinis"
 2005: "Sexy"
 2006: "Erota Mou"
 2006: "Epireastika"
 2006: "Pethaino"
 2006: "Eimai Enas Allos"
 2007: "Thavmata"
 2007: "Kako Paidi"
 2009: "Gia Sena Mono"
 2010: "Theos"
 2010: "Christougenna 2010"
 2011: "14 Flevari"
 2011: "Ok"
 2011: "To Refren"

Music videos 
 2003: "Sa Navagoi"
 2003: "Olos O Kosmos"
 2003: "As Teleiosoume"
 2004: "Fovamai"
 2005: "Gia Na Eimai Eilikrinis"
 2005: "Sexy" (MAD Version)
 2006: "Erota Mou"
 2006: "Epireastika"
 2006: "Pethaino"
 2007: "Thavmata"
 2007: "Kako Paidi"
 2010: "Theos"
 2010: "Christougenna 2010"
 2011: "14 Flevari"
 2011: "Ok"
 2011: "To Refren"

References

Discographies of Greek artists
Pop music discographies